David Harewood OBE (born 8 December 1965) is a British actor and presenter. He is best known for his roles as CIA Counterterrorism Director David Estes in Homeland (2011–2012), and as J'onn J'onzz / Martian Manhunter and Hank Henshaw / Cyborg Superman in Supergirl (2015–2021).

Early life
Harewood was born on 8 December 1965 in the Small Heath area of Birmingham, the son of a couple from Barbados who had moved to England in the late 1950s and early 1960s. His father was a lorry driver, while his mother was a caterer. He has a sister, Sandra, and two brothers, Rodger and Paul. He attended St Benedict's Junior School and Washwood Heath Academy. He was a member of the National Youth Theatre. In his youth, he worked at a wine bar in Birmingham city centre. At the age of 18, he gained a place at the Royal Academy of Dramatic Art.

Career
Harewood began acting in 1990 and has appeared in The Hawk, Great Moments in Aviation, Harnessing Peacocks, Mad Dogs and Englishmen, Blood Diamond, The Merchant of Venice and Strings. He is known for his television appearances on Ballykissangel, The Vice and Fat Friends. He played Don Coleman in Hustle (Series 7 The Fall of Railton FC (2011)). In 1997, he was the first black actor to play Othello at the National Theatre in London.

In 2008, he played Major Simon Brooks in The Palace; he also appeared (that December) on Celebrity Mastermind, with specialist subject Philip Pullman's His Dark Materials. He appeared in the BBC film adaptation of the Philip Pullman novels The Ruby in the Smoke and The Shadow in the North, both of which are titles from the Sally Lockhart Mysteries.

In 2009, Harewood appeared in the BBC single drama Mrs Mandela, playing Nelson Mandela. He played Brother Tuck in the third series of Robin Hood. He appeared in the Doctor Who story "The End of Time". He played Martin Luther King Jr. in the premiere of The Mountaintop, written by American playwright Katori Hall, directed by James Dacre, which opened at Theatre503 in London on 9 June 2009.

Harewood next appeared in two episodes of Chris Ryan's Strike Back as Colonel Tshuma. From June to September 2010, he played Theseus in the premiere of Moira Buffini's play Welcome to Thebes at the National Theatre in London. He played Martin Viner in an episode of New Tricks. He narrated Welcome to Lagos, a BBC documentary about Lagos, Nigeria. He also starred in British independent film The Hot Potato, the film also starred Ray Winstone, Colm Meaney and Jack Huston. He played Frankenstein's monster in the TV live event Frankenstein's Wedding.

From 2011, Harewood starred as David Estes, the director of the CIA's Counterterrorism Center, in the Showtime series Homeland. After appearing in 24 episodes, his character was killed off in a bomb explosion at the end of season 2. Also in 2011, he voiced Captain Quinton Cole in the video game Battlefield 3.

In May 2012, he presented a Party Election Broadcast for the British Labour Party.

In October 2013, Harewood voiced an interactive video campaign for the British Lung Foundation aiming to ban smoking in cars with children on board in the United Kingdom. In June 2014, he appeared in Tulip Fever.

In October 2015, he appeared as a core cast member on the CBS television series Supergirl as Hank Henshaw. Since his character was revealed (in the episode Human for a Day) to be J'onn J'onzz/Martian Manhunter posing as Henshaw, he portrays J'onn J'onzz with Henshaw's likeness as his human form and has a dual recurring role as the real Hank Henshaw / Cyborg Superman.

In 2017, Harewood was in London to attend the BT British Urban Film Festival at BT Tower. The following year, for his performance in "Free in Deed", Harewood won Best Actor at the 2018 British Urban Film Festival awards. Harewood was included in the 2019 edition of the Powerlist, ranking the 100 most influential Black Britons. Also in 2019, he played the position of goalkeeper for England in Soccer Aid for UNICEF 2019. Psychosis and Me, a documentary hosted and produced by Harewood received a BAFTA Television Award nominated for Single Documentary.

In October 2021, it was revealed that Harewood will make his feature directorial debut with For Whom The Bell Tolls, a boxing film about the rivalry between Chris Eubank and Nigel Benn.

In November 2021, The Guardian published an article focusing on Harewood and actor Ricardo P Lloyd comparing both of their lives and careers and the struggles black British actors face in the UK. This was part of Black British culture matters, curated by Lenny Henry & Marcus Ryder for The Guardian Saturday Culture Issue No7.

Harewood was appointed Member of the Order of the British Empire (MBE) in the 2012 New Year Honours for services to drama
and Officer of the Order of the British Empire (OBE) in the 2023 New Year Honours for services to drama and charity.

Personal life
Harewood married his long-term girlfriend Kirsty Handy in February 2013 in Saint James, Barbados. They have two daughters and the family resides in Streatham, London. Harewood is an avid supporter of Birmingham City Football Club.

In 2007, Harewood appeared on a BBC Look North programme which marked the bicentenary of the 1807 Slave Trade Act's passage through Parliament. As part of the programme, Harewood visited Harewood House and interviewed David Lascelles, as his ancestors in Barbados had been enslaved by the Earls of Harewood. In March 2023, it was announced that a portrait of Harewood was commissioned and would be hung in the Harewood house.

In 2007, Harewood donated his bone marrow and as a result saved the life of a patient.

Harewood is a mental health ambassador and has been open about his own struggles, confessing that he used to self-medicate with alcohol to deal with his bipolar-like symptoms, discarding the medication given to him by doctors. He was sectioned under the Mental Health Act, spent time on the Whittington Hospital psychiatric ward, and was prescribed the antipsychotic drug chlorpromazine. He subsequently expanded on his experiences, hosting a 2019 BBC documentary titled David Harewood: My Psychosis and Me.

Harewood appeared in Soccer Aid 2018 as England's celebrity goalkeeper. He saved two penalties during the penalty shootout, helping England to win the charity match. The event raised more than £5 million for UNICEF, a charity that Harewood supports.

In the 2019 European Parliament election, Harewood pledged his support for Change UK.

Filmography

Film

Television

Video games

Radio
David Harewood voiced the character of the American character Thurman Berkley in series one of the BBC radio series Chambers on the 4th May 1996. 

Harewood played Patroclus in the 1998 BBC radio trilogy Troy. He also played Henry Tilney in the Northanger Abbey radio adaptation (2005). On 4 May 2012, he hosted a special BBC Radio 2 Friday Night is Music Night celebrating the life of Ray Charles, broadcast live from Cheltenham Jazz Festival. The show featured the Guy Barker orchestra, with leader Cynthia Fleming and guest artists Madeline Bell, Gregory Porter, and James Tormé.

Harewood played the Marquis de Carabas in the BBC Radio 4 Radio Play of Neverwhere (2013).

In 2022, Harewood voiced Destruction of the Endless in Act III of Audible's full-cast audibook adaptation of Neil Gaiman's comic, The Sandman.

Awards and nominations 

 Order of the British Empire for services to drama (2012)

 Screen Actors Guild Awards-Outstanding Performance by an Ensemble in a Drama Series: Nominated (2012)
 Nashville Film Festival-Best Actor: Winner (2016)
 Independent Spirit Awards-Best Male Lead: Nominated (2017)
 Saturn Award-Best Supporting Actor on a Television Series: Nominated (2019)
 Edinburgh TV Festival-Variety Outstanding Achievement Award: Winner( 2020)

Books
  Harewood's memoir.

References

External links
 

1965 births
Living people
20th-century English male actors
21st-century English male actors
21st-century English memoirists
Alumni of RADA
Black British male actors
English male film actors
English male Shakespearean actors
English male stage actors
English male television actors
English male video game actors
English male voice actors
English people of Barbadian descent
English television directors
Male actors from Birmingham, West Midlands
Officers of the Order of the British Empire
National Youth Theatre members
People from Small Heath, Birmingham